Roger Wirth Falcone (born 27 June 1952) is an American physicist at University of California, Berkeley where he is a professor of physics. He is an Elected Fellow at The Optical Society and the American Academy of Arts and Sciences, and he currently serves as the President of the American Physical Society. He is the former director of the Advanced Light Source at Lawrence Berkeley National Laboratory.  He serves on the board of directors of the Fannie and John Hertz Foundation and is the chair of the International Scientific Advisory Committee of the Extreme-Light-Infrastructure.

References

Fellows of the American Association for the Advancement of Science
University of California, Berkeley College of Letters and Science faculty
21st-century American physicists
Living people
Fellows of the American Physical Society
Fellows of the American Academy of Arts and Sciences
Fellows of Optica (society)
1952 births
Presidents of the American Physical Society